In India, this is the network of roads maintained by the state governments. These roads are constructed and managed by the states' Public Works Department. The state highways are usually roads that link important cities, towns and district headquarters within the state and connect them with National Highways or state highways of neighbouring states.

As of 31 March 2016, the total length of state highways was 176,166 km. As of 31 March 2016, Maharashtra had the largest share in the total length of SH roads (22.14%), followed by Karnataka (11.11%), Gujarat (9.76%), Rajasthan (8.62%) and Tamil Nadu (6.67%).

History
Independent of the NHDP program, state governments have been implementing a number of state highway projects since 2000. By 2010, state highway projects worth $1.7 billion had been completed, and an additional $11.4 billion worth of projects were under implementation.

Bharatmala, a centrally-sponsored and funded road and highways project of the Government of India with a target of constructing  of new highways, has been started in 2018.

See also
 Roads in India

References

External links

2010 list of state highways under implementation - Published by the Government of India

 
Roads in India